Kentucky Route 1501 (KY 1501) is a  state secondary highway in central Kenton County. Known as Hands Pike, the highway extends from KY 17 east to KY 16 within Covington. KY 1501 was established by 1983 and is expected to be relocated at is western end in 2023.

Route description
KY 1501 begins at an intersection with KY 17 (Madison Pike) next to Banklick Creek at the city limit in the far southwestern part of the city of Covington. The highway heads east along two-lane Hands Pike, which meets the north end of a segment of KY 3035 (Madison Pike) and the west end of KY 3716 (Wayman Branch Road). At KY 3716, KY 1501 curves south and crosses Wayman Branch. The highway passes through several curves as it heads southeast toward its terminus at KY 16 (Taylor Mill Road) at a southeastern city limit of Covington. The Kentucky Transportation Cabinet includes the entire length of KY 1501 in the state secondary highway system.

History
The Kentucky Transportation Cabinet had established KY 1501 on Hands Pike by 1983, when the agency reclassified the highway from a rural secondary highway to a state secondary highway through a September 27, 1983, official order. The state adjusted the eastern and western ends of KY 1501 in conjunction with realignments of KY 17 and KY 16 that the state completed in 2002 when KY 17 was ajusted to 4 lane divided highway and in 2013 when KY 16 was also converted to 4 lanes with a center lane, respectively. The Kentucky Transportation Cabinet began construction of a new alignment of KY 1501 from KY 17's intersection with KY 3035 south of KY 1501's current terminus to south of KY 3716 in 2021. The project will eliminate several sharp curves and a 13% grade south of KY 3716. After the state completes the project, KY 3716 will be extended west to KY 17 along the current stretch of KY 1501. The agency expects to complete the relocation of KY 1501 by July 2023.

Updates
The New road is now open but its not 100% complete yet, the old road will be renamed to KY 3716 (Wayman Branch Road) but the sign still says Hands Pike Rd which probably will get fixed sometime this year

Major intersections

References

1501
Transportation in Kenton County, Kentucky